NOD, Nod, or nod may refer to:

Literature 
 Land of Nod, a place mentioned in the biblical book of Genesis
 Nod, a fictional character from the poem "Wynken, Blynken, and Nod"

Science 
 Night Observation Device or night vision device
 Non-occlusive disease (NOD),  a disease affecting the intestine. It is characterized by mesenteric ischemia without occlusion.
 NOD mice (non-obese diabetic mice), a strain of mice genetically prone to develop diabetes
 NOD32, a software antivirus application from ESET software
 Nod factor (nodulation factor), signaling molecules produced by rhizobia during the initiation of nodules on the root of legumes
 NOD-like receptor, components of the innate immune system
 A member of the Nucleotide-binding oligomerization domain-containing protein family
 Nucleotide-binding oligomerization domain-containing protein 1 (NOD1), a receptor protein that recognizes foreign molecules
 Nucleotide-binding oligomerization domain-containing protein 2 (NOD2), another receptor protein that recognizes foreign molecules

Other 
 Nod (gesture), a head gesture
 Northern Thai language, ISO 639-3 language code
 Nation of Domination, a former stable in the World Wrestling Federation
 Network of Disclosure, an organization concerned with the condition of comic books
 Night of Decadence, a campus party at Rice University in Houston, Texas, USA
 Notice of default, a notice given to a borrower regarding failure to pay debt
 Nintendo optical disc, a type of media used by the Nintendo GameCube and Wii
 Nod, the original name of former Atlanta-based power pop band Raves
 Nod, a Nodosaurus in The Land Before Time
 NOD, abbreviation for Национально-освободительное движение (National Liberation Movement), a right-wing political movement in Russia
 Brotherhood of Nod, a faction from Command & Conquer

See also

 
 
 Nods (disambiguation)
 Noddy (disambiguation)
 Noddies (disambiguation)